Joseph William Yukl (March 5, 1909 – March 16, 1981) was an American jazz trombonist.

Early life 
Yukl learned to play violin before switching to trombone as a teenager.

Career 
Yukl relocated to New York City in 1927, where he took a position playing in radio bands for CBS, and worked with Red Nichols and The Dorsey Brothers. He played with Joe Haymes in 1934, then with the Dorseys once again; through the end of the decade he also played with Louis Armstrong, Ray McKinley, Bing Crosby, Ben Pollack, Frankie Trumbauer, and Ted Fio Rito. In the 1940s he worked as a session musician for studio recordings in Los Angeles and for film and television; he played with Wingy Manone and Charlie LaVere in the 1940s. He appears in the film Rhythm Inn (1951) and is heard playing trombone in The Glenn Miller Story (1953).

References
Footnotes

General references
"Joe Yukl". The New Grove Dictionary of Jazz. 2nd edition, ed. Barry Kernfeld.

American jazz trombonists
Male trombonists
Musicians from Los Angeles
1909 births
1981 deaths
Jazz musicians from California
20th-century trombonists
20th-century American male musicians
American male jazz musicians
The Dorsey Brothers members